The following outline is provided as an overview of and topical guide to Jakarta:

Jakarta – capital and largest city of Indonesia. Located on the northwest coast of the world's most populous island Java, it is the centre of economics, culture and politics of Indonesia.

General reference 
 Pronunciation: ; 
 Common English name(s): Jakarta
 Official English name(s): Special Capital Region of Jakarta
 Common endonym(s): Jakarta
 Official endonym(s): Daerah Khusus Ibukota Jakarta
 Adjectival(s): 
 Demonym(s): Jakartan,

Geography of Jakarta 
Geography of Jakarta
 Jakarta is:
 a city
 a province of Indonesia
 capital of Indonesia
 Population of Jakarta: 10,075,310
 Area of Jakarta: 661.5 km2 (255.4 sq mi)

Location of Jakarta 

 Jakarta is situated within the following regions:
 Southern Hemisphere and Eastern Hemisphere
 Asia
 Southeast Asia
 Maritime Southeast Asia 
 Indonesia (outline)
 Java
 Jabodetabek
 Time zone(s): 
 Indonesian Western Standard Time (UTC+7)

Environment of Jakarta 
 Climate of Jakarta
 Flooding in Jakarta
 2007 Jakarta flood
 2013 Jakarta flood
 Jakarta Flood Canal

Natural geographic features of Jakarta 

 Bays in Jakarta
 Jakarta Bay
 Beaches in Jakarta
 Ancol
 Harbours in Jakarta
 Port of Tanjung Priok
 Sunda Kelapa
Muara Angke
 Islands in Jakarta
 Thousand Islands, Indonesia
 Pramuka Island
 Onrust Island
 Lakes in Jakarta
 Setu Babakan
 Rivers in Jakarta
 Ciliwung River
 Pesanggrahan River
 Angke River
 Sunter River
 Grogol River

Areas of Jakarta

Administrative cities and regencies of Jakarta 
 Central Jakarta
 East Jakarta
 North Jakarta
 South Jakarta
 West Jakarta
 Thousand Islands, Indonesia

Neighborhoods (localities) in Jakarta 
 Jakarta Old Town
 Glodok
 Blok M
 Tanah Abang
 Senen
 Pasar Baru
 Kelapa Gading
 Mangga Dua, Jakarta
 Jatinegara
 Kemang, Jakarta

Locations in Jakarta 

 Tourist attractions in Jakarta
 Museums in Jakarta
 Shopping areas and markets

Cultural and exhibition centres in Jakarta 
 Jakarta Convention Centre

Monuments and memorials in Jakarta 

 National Monument (Indonesia)
 Selamat Datang Monument

Museums and art galleries in Jakarta 
Museums in Jakarta
 Jakarta History Museum
 Wayang Museum
 Museum of Fine Arts and Ceramics
 Maritime Museum (Indonesia)
 Museum Bank Indonesia
 National Museum of Indonesia
 Taman Prasasti Museum
 Textile Museum (Jakarta)
 Indonesia Museum
 Purna Bhakti Pertiwi Museum
 Satriamandala Museum
 Bentara Budaya Jakarta

Parks and gardens in Jakarta 
Parks in Jakarta
 Kalijodo Park
 Menteng Park
 Taman Suropati
 Muara Angke Wildlife Reserve
 Taman Mini Indonesia Indah
 Taman Impian Jaya Ancol
 Tebet Eco Park
 Situ Lembang Park

Public squares in Jakarta 

 Merdeka Square
 Lapangan Banteng

Religious buildings in Jakarta 
 Istiqlal Mosque, Jakarta
 Jakarta Cathedral
 Immanuel Church, Jakarta
 Gereja Sion

Secular buildings in Jakarta 
 DPR/MPR Building
 Istana Merdeka
 Istana Negara (Jakarta)
 Jakarta City Hall

Streets in Jakarta 
 Jalan M.H. Thamrin
 Jalan Jenderal Sudirman
 Jalan H.R. Rasuna Said
 Jalan Jenderal Gatot Subroto
 Jalan Jaksa

Theatres in Jakarta 
 Taman Ismail Marzuki
 Gedung Kesenian Jakarta

Towers in Jakarta 
 Gama Tower
 Thamrin Nine
 Wisma 46

Demographics of Jakarta 

Demographics of Jakarta

Government and politics of Jakarta 

Government and politics of Jakarta
 Administrative divisions of Jakarta
 Governor of Jakarta
 Jakarta City Hall
 Jakarta Regional People's Representative Council
 Sister cities of Jakarta

Law and order in Jakarta 
 Crime in Jakarta
 Jakarta Regional Metropolitan Police

Indonesian government in Jakarta 
 Merdeka Palace
 Istana Negara (Jakarta)
 DPR/MPR Building

History of Jakarta

History of Jakarta

History of Jakarta, by period or event 

Timeline of Jakarta
 Early kingdoms (4th century AD)
 Jakarta under the Kingdom of Sunda (669–1527)
 Jakarta under the Banten Sultanate (1527–1619)
 Dutch Batavia (1610-1942)
 Japanese occupation (1942–1945)
 National revolution era (1945–1949)
 Transition into a capital of an independent nation (1950s)
 Sukarno's nationalistic projects (1960-1965)
 Rise of Ali Sadikin (1966 – late 1970s)
 Economic growth (late 1970s – 1980s)
 1980s–present

History of Jakarta, by subject

Culture of Jakarta 

Culture of Jakarta
 Betawi people – an Austronesian ethnic group native to the city of Jakarta and its immediate outskirts, as such often described as the native inhabitants of the city. They are the descendants of the people who inhabited Batavia (the colonial name of Jakarta) from during the 17th century.

Arts in Jakarta

Architecture of Jakarta 

Architecture of Jakarta
 Colonial architecture in Jakarta
 Tallest buildings in Jakarta

Cinema of Jakarta 

Cinema of Jakarta
 Jakarta International Film Festival

Literature of Jakarta 

Literature of Jakarta

Music and ballet of Jakarta 
Music of Jakarta
 Gambang kromong
 Tanjidor
 Kroncong
 Ballet of Jakarta
 Music festivals and competitions in Jakarta
 Music schools in Jakarta
 Music venues in Jakarta
 Musical ensembles in Jakarta
 Musicians from Jakarta
 Chrisye
 Songs about Jakarta

Performing arts of Jakarta 
 Ondel-ondel
 Lenong

Visual arts of Jakarta 

Events and festivals in Jakarta
 Jakarta International Film Festival (JiFFest)
 Jakarta International Java Jazz Festival
 Djakarta Warehouse Project
 Jakarta Fashion Week
 Jakarta Fair

Languages of Jakarta
 Betawi language

Media in Jakarta 
Media in Jakarta
 Newspapers in Jakarta
Kompas
Republika
Koran Tempo
The Jakarta Post
 List of radio stations in Jakarta
 Television in Jakarta
 TVRI
 MetroTV
 tvOne
 Kompas TV
 Trans TV
 Trans 7
 RCTI
 MNC
 SCTV
 Global TV
 Indosiar
 ANTV
 RTV
 NET.

Religion in Jakarta 

Religion in Jakarta
 Catholicism in Jakarta 
Roman Catholic Archdiocese of Jakarta
Catholic Bishops and Archbishops of Jakarta
Jakarta Cathedral

Sports in Jakarta 

Jakarta#Sport
 Basketball in Jakarta
 Satria Muda Pertamina Jakarta
 Amartha Hangtuah
 Stadium Jakarta
 Football in Jakarta
 Association football in Jakarta
 Persija Jakarta
 Persitara Jakarta Utara
 PSJS Jakarta Selatan
 Sports competitions in Jakarta
 Jakarta Marathon
 Sports venues in Jakarta
 Gelora Bung Karno Sports Complex
Gelora Bung Karno Main Stadium
Gelora Bung Karno Madya Stadium
Istora Senayan
 The BritAma Arena
 Jakarta International Velodrome
 Jakarta International Equestrian Park
 Jakarta International Stadium
 Soemantri Brodjonegoro Stadium
 Kamal Muara Stadium
 PTIK Stadium

Economy and infrastructure of Jakarta 

Economy of Jakarta
 Communications in Jakarta
 Financial services in Jakarta
 Indonesia Stock Exchange
 Bank Indonesia
 Golden Triangle of Jakarta
 Sudirman Central Business District
 Water privatisation in Jakarta
 Hotels in Jakarta
 Hotel Aryaduta Jakarta
 Hotel Borobudur
 Hotel Indonesia
 Hotel Sriwijaya, Jakarta
 JW Marriott Jakarta
 Ritz-Carlton Jakarta
 Restaurants and cafés in Jakarta
 Cafe Batavia
 Lenggang Jakarta
 Shopping malls and markets in Jakarta
 List of shopping malls in Jakarta
 Plaza Indonesia
 Grand Indonesia Shopping Town
 Plaza Senayan
 Senayan City
 Pacific Place
 Mall Taman Anggrek
 Pondok Indah Mall
 Mal Kelapa Gading
 Central Park Jakarta
 Lotte Shopping Avenue
 Gandaria City
 Kota Kasablanka
 Kemang Village
 Lippo Mall Puri
 Bay Walk Mall
 Senayan City
 Kuningan City
 Tanah Abang Market
 Tourism in Jakarta

Transport in Jakarta 

Transport in Jakarta
 Air transport in Jakarta
 Airports in Jakarta
 Soekarno–Hatta International Airport
 Halim Perdanakusuma International Airport
 Maritime transport in Jakarta 
 Port of Tanjung Priok
 Sunda Kelapa
 Road transport in Jakarta
 Buses in Jakarta
TransJakarta
Kopaja
MetroMini
Pengangkutan Penumpang Djakarta
 Bajaj
 Cycling in Jakarta

Rail transport in Jakarta 

Rail transport in Jakarta
 KRL Commuterline
 Jakarta MRT
 Jakarta LRT
 Greater Jakarta LRT
 Railway stations in Jakarta
Gambir railway station
Pasar Senen railway station
Manggarai railway station
Jakarta Kota railway station
 Jakarta Monorail
 Trams in Jakarta

Education in Jakarta 

Education in Jakarta
 Universities in Jakarta
 University of Indonesia
 Syarif Hidayatullah State Islamic University Jakarta
 Jakarta State Polytechnic
 Atma Jaya University
 Trisakti University
 Bina Nusantara University
 Tarumanagara University
 Universitas Kristen Indonesia
 YARSI University

Healthcare in Jakarta 

Healthcare in Jakarta
 Hospitals in Jakarta
 Cikini Hospital
 Dharmais Hospital
 Dr. Cipto Mangunkusumo Hospital
 Gatot Soebroto Army Hospital
 Hermina Hospital
 Mayapada Hospital
 Medika Hospital
 Medistra Hospital
 Mitra Keluarga Hospital
 Siloam Hospital

See also 

 Outline of geography

References

External links 

Jakarta
Jakarta
 1